Alan Sedgwick Rice (born 29 August 1929) is a former English cricketer.  Rice was a right-handed batsman who bowled right-arm fast-medium.  He was born in Leicester, Leicestershire.

Rice made his first-class debut for Leicestershire in 1954 against Middlesex at Lord's.  Rice played two further first-class matches for Leicestershire, both coming in 1954 against Somerset and Middlesex.  In his three first-class matches, he scored 15 runs at a batting average of 7.50, with a high score of 13.  With the ball he claimed 8 wickets at a bowling average of 33.62, with best figures of 3/34.

His son, Gary, played Minor counties and List A cricket for Cambridgeshire.

References

External links
Alan Rice at ESPNcricinfo
Alan Rice at CricketArchive

1929 births
Living people
Cricketers from Leicester
English cricketers
Leicestershire cricketers